Dale Crover (born October 23, 1967) is an American rock musician. Crover is best known as the drummer for Melvins and has also been the drummer for Men of Porn, Shrinebuilder, Crystal Fairy and, for a brief time, Nirvana. He is also guitarist and vocalist for Altamont. He has toured with Fantômas (filling in for Dave Lombardo), Off!, and Redd Kross. In 2016, Rolling Stone listed him as the 69th greatest drummer of all time.

Biography 
Melvins recruited Crover on drums in 1984 from an Iron Maiden cover band, following original drummer Mike Dillard's departure. In late 1985, Crover played bass in Fecal Matter, a band he formed with Kurt Cobain and Greg Hokanson. After Hokanson left the band, Cobain and Crover recorded Illiteracy Will Prevail on a 4-track on Easter 1986 at Cobain's aunt's home in Seattle, Washington. Crover played bass and drums on the demo. "Spank Thru" from this demo appears on the Nirvana album Sliver: The Best of the Box. Fecal Matter disbanded in 1986.

Crover drummed on Nirvana's ten-song demo recorded January 23, 1988, at Reciprocal Recording Studios in Seattle. Nine of these songs have been officially released:
 "Floyd the Barber", "Paper Cuts", and "Downer" – Bleach
 "Beeswax", "Downer", "Hairspray Queen", "Mexican Seafood", and "Aero Zeppelin" – Incesticide
 "If You Must" and "Pen Cap Chew" – With the Lights Out

Nirvana with Crover played a 14-song show in Tacoma, Washington, on the night of the same day that they did the demo session. Three cuts from the show – "Downer", "Floyd the Barber", and "Raunchola"/"Moby Dick" – appear on With the Lights Out. Later in 1988, Crover and Melvins' bandmate Buzz Osborne relocated to San Francisco, California.

Crover briefly rejoined Nirvana during a short west-coast tour with Sonic Youth in August 1990. In April 1991, Crover drummed on a demo version of "Drain You" with Cobain on guitar and vocals and Dave Grohl on bass guitar. The track appears on With the Lights Out.

Crover is also credited as the drummer on most of the tracks on Mike Patton's Peeping Tom project from 2006.

In 1994, Crover founded the band Altamont with Joey Osbourne and Dan Southwick of Acid King. He produced and performed additional vocals on Acid King's début release that year. During this time he was also married to Acid King's frontwoman Lori S., but they divorced. Nirvana was inducted into the Rock and Roll Hall of Fame in April 2014. Although not officially inducted with the band, he was singled out for his work with them during Crover's successor Dave Grohl's acceptance speech.

He has released several records under his own name and as the Dale Crover Band.

Appearances 
Dale Crover made an appearance in Neil Young's video "Harvest Moon" playing Neil Young. This was largely due to his physical resemblance of the younger Young.

Cartoon versions of Crover and bandmate Osborne appear in an episode of Uncle Grandpa as well.

Discography

References

External links 
 

1967 births
Living people
American punk rock drummers
American male drummers
Grunge musicians
American heavy metal musicians
Nirvana (band) members
American punk rock guitarists
People from Aberdeen, Washington
Guitarists from Washington (state)
American male guitarists
Fantômas (band) members
Melvins members
20th-century American drummers
20th-century American guitarists
Raging Slab members
Joyful Noise Recordings artists
Crystal Fairy (band) members
Shrinebuilder members